Rachel Payne is an Australian politician. She is a member of the Victorian Legislative Council representing the South-Eastern Metropolitan since 26 November 2022. Payne is a member of Legalise Cannabis Victoria.

Payne ran for the Reason Party in the 2019 federal election in the seat of Menzies, receiving just over 2% of the vote.

A year later, she again ran for Reason, this time in the City of Moreland in the 2020 Victorian local government elections.

References 

Living people
Members of the Victorian Legislative Council
21st-century Australian politicians
Legalise Cannabis Victoria Party members of the Parliament of Victoria
Year of birth missing (living people)